Richard Graham Meale, AM, MBE (24 August 193223 November 2009) was an Australian composer of instrumental works and operas.

Life and works

Sydney 1932–1970
Meale was born in Sydney in 1932. At the time the Meale family lived in Marrickville, an inner suburb of Sydney. Meale's father Oliver was a foreman at a Pipe Works, and his mother Lilla Adeline kept house. He had a married brother David who predeceased him.

Meale was a prodigious teenager who left school because he hated exams. In the 1960s he studied piano with Winifred Burston at the NSW State Conservatorium of Music, as well as clarinet, harp, music history and theory, but as a composer was mostly self-taught. Meale's reputation as a pianist grew exponentially with each premiere of new works by Pierre Boulez, Karlheinz Stockhausen and other post-war European giants, but especially the music of Olivier Messiaen. "To hear Meale play Messiaen is like hearing a sermon by John the Baptist," Melbourne critic Kenneth Hince wrote. In 1964 Meale organized the Australian premiere of Schoenberg's Pierrot Lunaire (52 years after the Berlin one). Meale had been notating his own compositions since his teens; his powerful Sonata for flute and piano was the first work to survive his criticism. Meale left the Conservatorium without a diploma.

Meale worked 1963–1969 as an ABC concert and radio programmer. Five years working as a buyer for record shops had fed an innate curiosity into music from all cultures and periods.

He was by the 1970s a member of a group of gay men — including composers John Bygate and Ian Farr — bent on exploring extremes of experience, inner and outer, through drink, drugs and sex — getting "smashed". He remained an active member of this group throughout his career until all except him had died, mainly of AIDS or overdoses. Aesthetically their search for extreme experience showed eventually in his compositions inspired by Rimbaud and by the voyages of Christopher Columbus. The technical structure of his work was from the start atonal in the manner of the international avant-garde, though rarely fully serialist.

Los Angeles 1960–1961
His career side-stepped the well-worn path of Australian musicians to England. Instead he played in the musical ensembles of Bali, Java and Japan at the Institute of Ethnomusicology at the University of California, Los Angeles and at other American institutions on a Ford Foundation grant. The end result was two works exploring the world of Basho and Edo Japan, Clouds now and then and Nocturnes: soon it will die.

Spain
Classical Spain was another world that called. Very High Kings is Meale's tribute to the mystical experience of Christopher Columbus; Los Aloboradas to the troubadours; Homage to García Lorca is what it says. Yet Meale's trip to Spain showed that his attachment was to imaginary worlds: the actual Spanish light reminded him painfully of Australia and he returned home.

I was not happy as a traveller, I did not feel really at home anywhere I went, even in Spain which was the most I felt at home, I still was a foreigner. I missed Australia, and I can't tell why. It's just this is what I grew up with and this is the thing I wanted to make meaning of in my life.

In other words, Meale's music and audience were international, not to say other-worldly; his nationalism was founded on a visceral attachment to place.

Adelaide 1969–1991
From 1969 to 1988 he was a member of the music faculty of the University of Adelaide, South Australia, appointed partly on the personal fiat of Don Dunstan, the South Australian Premier, who became a friend and collaborator.

As a teacher ... he could encourage or pour scorn as he saw fit, but you always felt he cared at a deep level as you came away from lessons with your head buzzing, all fired up to read Lorca, McLuhan or Camus ("If you don't read this you're a fool", he would say).

[He] undertook his public roles - as an academic involved in curriculum reform, as a founding member of the Adelaide Festival Centre Trust and later as a long-term Board Director of the Australasian Performing Right Association - very seriously ... even at the expense of his own health.

For the Australian pianist Roger Woodward Meale wrote Coruscations, a complex piano piece, widely admired internationally, adapting a serial technique of Boulez. In his 1972 book about Australia's contemporary composers, James Murdoch described Meale as "... the dominating figure in Australian composition". 

But Coruscations was followed by a five-year silence. Though firmly part of the avant garde amongst Australian composers, Meale experienced a stylistic rethink in the 1970s, abandoning an exclusively atonal approach in his orchestral work Viridian (1979) and his String Quartet No. 2 (1980) for a polytonal approach, and in later works embracing a frank tonality, with fin-de-siècle overtones, while retaining an individual voice:

The problem that I was encountering was brought to a head in 1979 when I began my Second String Quartet. Sadly, my best friend, Stephen Wilson, died after a sudden onset of cancer. It now became a matter of personal necessity to write a piece that would be a memorial to him. So it became clear that the work could not be based on any artifice; its existence had to lie in its emotional truth.

I found that I could not express certain things in the atonal idiom. I could not express genuine tenderness, affection, various other things. I thought there is something wrong with an art form that limits. It was then I began to have suspicion. I'm quite content, however, to say, look, it no longer suited me.

Whatever the motive, the results saw a steep decline in Meale's reputation. "He was perhaps Australia’s best expressionist, especially in moving early works such as Homage to García Lorca, and Clouds now and then. In his later years, like so many 20th-century Australian  modernist composers, he turned to writing late-romantic tosh, as if the only function of composers was to support the film industry."

He is best known in this later period for the 1986 opera Voss, with a libretto by David Malouf based on the novel of the same title by Patrick White. (White knew and admired Meale, but thought his treatment of the novel insufficiently "austere and gritty".) Malouf also collaborated with Meale on his second operatic project, Mer de glace (1986–91), a tableaux-like juxtaposition of some ideas of the novel Frankenstein alongside the real dealings of Mary Shelley with Percy Bysshe Shelley and Lord Byron.

Mullumbimby 1991–2000
Meale left Adelaide in 1991 and moved to a rambling house in a rainforest near Mullumbimby on the NSW north coast. "For years after he went up there I would get postings of how he was going; increasingly isolated, increasingly alcoholic, increasingly shambolic; lost in the beautiful world of the imagination and creativity we had all once sought as the only worthwhile path of human endeavour." Most of Meale's communications with friends in that period were by telephone, mimicking the distant, disembodied but profound communications with the character of Laura in far-off Sydney of the explorer Voss in Meale's eponymous opera.

Sydney 2000–2009
On his visits to Sydney "he stayed with music publisher and broadcaster Julie Simonds and her family, eventually residing there until 2007. Then he moved in with his niece Amanda [Meale] and her family in Frenchs Forest."

He died in Sydney on 23 November 2009 at the age of 77.

Table of works by Richard Meale
This table has been compiled from the website of the Australian Music Centre, from the Meale entry on the website of the Move label and from performance times given by Apple Music.

Honours, awards and nominations

Honours
Meale was made a Member of the Order of the British Empire (MBE) in 1971 and a Member of the Order of Australia (AM) in 1985. In 2000 Meale was conferred Doctor of Letters honoris causa by the University of New England.

In 2011, Voss was added to the National Film and Sound Archive of Australia's Sounds of Australia registry.

APRA Awards
The APRA Awards have been presented annually since 1982 by the Australasian Performing Right Association (APRA).

|-
| rowspan="2"| 2003 || Three Miró Pieces – Richard Meale || Best Composition by an Australian Composer || 
|-
| Three Miró Pieces (Richard Meale) – Sydney Symphony Orchestra || Orchestral Work of the Year ||

Don Banks Music Award
The Don Banks Music Award was established in 1984 to publicly honour a senior artist of high distinction who has made an outstanding and sustained contribution to music in Australia. It was founded by the Australia Council in honour of Don Banks, Australian composer, performer and the first chair of its music board.

|-
| 1997
| Richard Meale
| Don Banks Music Award
| 
|-

References

Bibliography
 "Richard Meale – Abandoning Tonality" [radio transcript]. 2008. In Talking to Kinky and Karlheinz – 170 musicians get vocal on The Music Show ed. Anni Heino, 263–268. Sydney: ABC Books. .

•

External links
Canberra School of Music Citation for an Honorary Degree
Richard Meale biography at the Australian Music Centre
 'Voss' was added to the National Film and Sound Archive's Sounds of Australia registry in 2011.

1932 births
2009 deaths
APRA Award winners
Sydney Conservatorium of Music alumni
20th-century classical composers
Australian opera composers
Members of the Order of Australia
Australian Members of the Order of the British Empire
Australian male classical composers
20th-century Australian musicians
20th-century Australian male musicians
Australian LGBT musicians
LGBT classical composers
LGBT classical musicians